James Edwin "Trey" Trainor III is an American  Republican lawyer and government official. He became a member of the Federal Election Commission after President Donald Trump nominated him and the Senate confirmed him. He served as chair of the commission in 2020.

Career
Trainor was admitted to the bar in Texas in 2003. He practiced election law, campaign finance, and ethics as a partner in Akerman LLP's Austin office. He has long supported reduced regulation of money in politics, and represented the right-wing advocacy group Empower Texans in lengthy disputes with the Texas Ethics Commission over whether the group was obligated to disclose its donors. 

During the 2012 Republican primaries, Trainor was counsel for the presidential campaign of Texas Governor Rick Perry. In the 2016 Republican primaries, Trainor initially supported Ted Cruz, but later worked for Donald Trump. As general counsel to the 2016 Republican National Convention platform committee, Trainor led the party's efforts to stymie last-ditch Never Trump efforts from anti-Trump Republican convention delegates. In 2017, Trainor was appointed assistant general counsel to the Texas Republican Party; newly elected party chairman James Dickey named him to the post. Trainor was also general counsel to the Secretary of State of Texas.

After Trump became president, Trainor joined his administration as special assistant to Secretary of Defense James Mattis.

FEC tenure
On September 14, 2017, Trump nominated Trainor to be a member of the Federal Election Commission for a term expiring April 30, 2023. Trainor's nomination languished in the Republican-controlled Senate for years, with Trump re-nominating him twice (in 2019 and 2020). During his FEC confirmation hearings, he refused to recuse himself from matters related to the Trump campaign.  

On May 19, 2020, the Senate voted to invoke cloture on his nomination by a 50–43 vote and later that day confirmed his nomination by a 49–43 vote. Trump's nomination of Trainor broke a precedent; traditionally, presidents have made nominations to the FEC in pairs (simultaneously nominating one Republican and one Democrat); Trump's decision to nominate Trainor alone was criticized by Democrats. 

Trainor's confirmation gave the FEC a quorum, with four of the six commission seats filled (two Republicans, one Democrat and an independent who mostly sides with the Democrat). This theoretically allowed the FEC to move forward on a large backlog of enforcement matters that had effectively halted FEC activity for months during a presidential election year. However, the FEC was still expected to deadlock frequently (as the commission had done for more than a decade) along party lines, since many actions of the commission require a unanimous vote.

On June 18, 2020, Trainor was elected as chair for the remainder of 2020, with Steven T. Walther selected as vice chair.

In interviews in September 2020 with the Religion News Service, as well as Michael Voris of the right-wing Catholic website Church Militant, Trainor said that churches could endorse political candidates, contrary to common understandings of the Johnson Amendment, which bars tax-exempt nonprofits from endorsing political candidates. He justified this by pointing to Trump's 2017 executive order that the amendment should not be enforced.  In the same interviews, Trainor called the separation of church and state a "fallacy" and accused Catholic bishops of "hiding behind" the church's nonprofit status to avoid involvement in the 2020 U.S. elections, which Trainor called a "spiritual war." FEC Commissioner Ellen Weintraub disagreed with Trainor's statements on the Johnson Amendment (saying that the amendment remains law and "cannot be undone with an executive order") and took issue with his depiction of elections as "spiritual wars."

References

21st-century American lawyers
Living people
Members of the Federal Election Commission
Texas A&M University alumni
Texas lawyers
Texas Republicans
Trump administration personnel
Year of birth missing (living people)